The People's Artist was an honorary title for outstanding art performers of the People's Socialist Republic of Albania, whose merits were exceptional in the sphere of development of the performing arts (theatre, music, cinema and art). It was created by law in 1960 and amended in 1980. The title is no longer given in Albania after the law was amended in 1996. The equivalent of it became the "Grand Master of Work" title, that was also substituted with the "Grand Master" title after a 2001 amendment of the 1996 law.

Creation
Founded on 26 October 1960, the honorary title of “Artist of the People” was bestowed upon singers, composers, orchestra directors, musicians, stage managers, ballet dancers, and actors in theater, cinema, and opera whose works displayed great artistic value towards the development of the performing arts in the People's Socialist Republic of Albania.
When first established, the recipient of the title only received a certificate from the Presidium of the People’s Assembly. Sometime in the mid to late 1960s, a badge was created as an outward symbol of the title. The badge consisted of a round gilt or brass medal  in diameter with white enameled base with thin rays, upon which is a ruby red enamel band with inscription ARTIST I POPULLIT, at the center a black enameled Albanian double headed eagle on a bright red circle, surmounted by ruby red star. The back of the badge is plain.

Its recipients include many of the country's most-acclaimed composers, dancers, singers, film and theatre directors and actors. Normally, a person was named the People's Artist after 40 years of age. An exception was made for ballet dancers.

Recipients

Lola Gjoka (Aleksi)
Dhimitër Anagnosti
Gaqo Çako
Vitore Çeli
Melpomeni Çobani
Tish Daija 
Marjana Daja
Zef Deda
Kristaq Dhamo
Shkurte Fejza
Jorgjia Filçe-Truja
Naim Frashëri
Vangjush Furxhi
Viktor Gjoka
Pjetër Gjoka
Frrok Haxhia
Demir Hyskja
Feim Ibrahimi
Mirush Kabashi
Xhanfise Keko
Mustafa Krantja
Tinka Kurti
Marie Logoreci
Ibrahim Madhi
Pirro Mani
Violeta Manushi
Avni Mula
Robert Ndrenika
Luftar Paja
Drita Pelingu
Sulejman Pitarka
Sandër Prosi
Pandi Raidhi
Kadri Roshi
Skënder Sallaku
Ndue Shyti
Andrea Skanjeti
Tefta Tashko-Koço
Albert Vërria
Mentor Xhemali
Margarita Xhepa
Çesk Zadeja
Vaçe Zela
Nikolla Zoraqi
Demir Zyko
Agim Zajmi

See also
Orders, decorations and medals of Albania
Merited Artist of Albania
People's Artist

References

Albania
Awards established in 1960
Title
 
1960 establishments in Albania